Dumre  is a village development committee in Udayapur District in the Sagarmatha Zone of south-eastern Nepal. At the time of the 1991 Nepal census it had a population of 11,749 people living in 2510 individual households.

There is another nepali town Dumre nearby Bandipur (about 3 km).

References

External links
UN map of the municipalities of Udayapur District

Populated places in Udayapur District